The Muereasca is a right tributary of the river Olt in Romania. It flows into the Olt in Gura Văii.

References

Rivers of Romania
Rivers of Vâlcea County